The Train of Salt and Sugar is a 2016 internationally co-produced adventure film written and directed by Licínio Azevedo. It was selected as the Mozambican entry for the Best Foreign Language Film at the 90th Academy Awards, but it was not nominated.

Plot
In the midst of civil war, a train with passengers and goods must travel 500 miles through guerrilla-held territory.

Cast
 Thiago Justino as Salomão
 Melanie de Vales Rafael as Rosa
 Matamba Joaquim as Taiar
 Absalão Narduela as Ascêncio
 Mário Mabjaia as Adriano Gil
 Hermelinda Simela	as Amélia
 Melanie de Vales Rafael as Rosa

See also
 List of submissions to the 90th Academy Awards for Best Foreign Language Film
 List of Mozambican submissions for the Academy Award for Best Foreign Language Film

References

External links
 

2016 films
2010s adventure films
Mozambican drama films
2010s Portuguese-language films
Portuguese adventure films
2010s French films
French adventure films
South African adventure films
Brazilian adventure films